James Praed may refer to:

 James Praed (died 1706) (1655–1706), English politician
 James Praed (died 1687), English politician